Dog is a 2022 American comedy drama road film directed by Channing Tatum and Reid Carolin, both making their respective film directorial debuts, based on a story by Carolin and Brett Rodriguez. The film stars Tatum as an Army Ranger who is tasked with escorting the military dog of his fallen friend to his funeral. The film also stars Jane Adams, Kevin Nash, Q'orianka Kilcher, Ethan Suplee, Emmy Raver-Lampman, and Nicole LaLiberte in supporting roles. The film was produced by Free Association on a budget of $15 million.

The film was released in the United States on February 18, 2022, by United Artists Releasing. The film received generally positive reviews from critics, praising Tatum's direction and performance. It was also a box office success, grossing $85 million worldwide.

Plot
Jackson Briggs, a former U.S. Army Ranger suffering from PTSD, tries to apply for a rotation position in Pakistan, but is deemed unfit for service due to a brain injury. He is notified that his friend and former partner, Riley Rodriguez, was killed in a car accident the night before. The morning after attending a memorial service at a local bar, Briggs is called in to Fort Lewis on a special assignment to escort Riley’s military dog, Lulu, a Belgian Malinois with a history of aggressive behavior, to attend his funeral in Nogales, Arizona, after which he is to bring her to White Sands, where she will be euthanized. Initially hesitant, Briggs agrees when his former company commander, Captain Jones, promises to recommend him for the position.

On the road, when Briggs stops at a shooting range, Lulu breaks out of her cage and destroys the inside of his 1984 Ford Bronco. Frustrated, Briggs hides sedatives in a hot dog, causing Lulu to fall asleep after she eats it. In Portland, Oregon, Briggs tries to hit on women in a bar, but most are repelled by his brash personality. Outside, he meets two friends, Bella and Zoe, who invite him to their house for a threesome. While Briggs is inside, Lulu panics, alerting a neighbor. Believing her to be the victim of abuse, the neighbor frees her from the car, but is promptly attacked. Briggs runs outsides and pulls them apart, but Bella and Zoe are disturbed by the display and lock Briggs outside.

The next morning, while on the Pacific Coast Highway, Lulu climbs out of the back of the car, forcing Briggs to pull over and chase her through a nearby forest. They stumble across a marijuana farm in the woods, where Briggs is tranquilized by the farm's owner, Gus. He wakes up tied to a chair in the shed, but he is able to escape. He reunites with Lulu, who has injured her paw, and is being treated by Gus's wife, Tamara. Briggs and Gus reconcile by looking through Lulu's "I Love Me" book, which contains photos from her service during the War in Afghanistan. After Lulu is treated, Tamara gives Briggs a psychic reading before Briggs and Lulu continue on the road.

In San Francisco, Briggs cons a free hotel room by pretending to be a blind veteran, with Lulu as his seeing-eye dog. Briggs takes her to his room and gives her a bath. He tries to leave the room, but Lulu barks until Briggs relents and brings her with him. In the lobby, Lulu attacks a Middle Eastern man, Dr. Al-Farid, and Briggs is arrested for a hate crime. At the station, Briggs is put in a lineup, where he apologizes to Al-Farid, who agrees not to press charges on the condition that Briggs seek professional help for his behavior. While retrieving Lulu, the medic reveals that she has anxiety. In Los Angeles, Briggs tries to visit his estranged 3-year-old daughter, Sam, but his wife, Niki, does not allow him to. Briggs visits Noah, a former Army Ranger who adopted and rehabilitated Lulu's brother, Nuke. Noah teaches Briggs to bond with Lulu in terms she understands, allowing him to form a deeper connection with her.

After leaving Noah's, the Bronco breaks down during a thunderstorm, forcing Briggs and Lulu to shelter in an abandoned barn. The next morning, Briggs and Lulu hitchhike to Nogales in time for the funeral, where Briggs stays with her to keep her calm during the traditional rifle salute. Afterwards, while Briggs gets his truck repaired, he calls Jones and tells him that Lulu's condition has improved, but Jones is unconcerned. Briggs drives into the desert and encourages Lulu to run away. When she does not, they stay in a motel overnight. Briggs suffers from a seizure, but is calmed by Lulu. In the morning, Briggs drops Lulu off at White Sands, but changes his mind when he sees her panicking. He drives back to the gate and takes Lulu back, driving away with her. Months later, Briggs writes a letter addressed to her, revealing that he has adopted her. He thanks her for saving his life and making him a better man as Niki takes him to meet Sam.

Cast
 Channing Tatum as Jackson Briggs
 Jane Adams as Tamara
 Kevin Nash as Gus
 Q'orianka Kilcher as Niki
 Ethan Suplee as Noah
 Emmy Raver-Lampman as Bella
 Nicole LaLiberte as Zoe
 Luke Forbes as Captain Jones
 Ronnie Gene Blevins as Keith
 Aqueela Zoll as Callan
 Junes Zahdi as Dr. Al-Farid
 Amanda Booth as Tiffany
 Cayden Boyd as Corporal Levitz
 Bill Burr as Officer O’Shaughnessy (uncredited)
Eric Urbiztondo appears as Riley Rodriguez in photographs. Lulu is played by three identical Belgian Malinois dogs named Britta, Zuza, and Lana 5, where Nuke is played by a Belgian Malinois named Sam. Comedian Bill Burr makes an uncredited cameo appearance as a San Francisco police officer.

Production
The film was inspired by a real road trip director Channing Tatum took with his dying dog, a pitbull mix also named Lulu, after she was diagnosed with cancer in 2018. Tatum told Yahoo! News, "When I went on my last road trip with my puppy, [I experienced] that feeling of, 'There's nothing I can do. There's nothing left to do. You just have to accept it and be thankful for the time that you did get and know that they're not supposed to be here forever. I'm supposed to go on and she has to go someplace else." Tatum's dog died on December 19, 2018, and the film is dedicated to her memory. Tatum described the filmmaking process as "cathartic", telling Forbes that "It gave me a lot of perspective on what she meant to me, what her purpose was in this life that we had together."

On November 5, 2019, Tatum and Reid Carolin were announced as the directors, both to be making their directorial debuts, from a script Carolin wrote with Brett Rodriguez. Tatum and Carolin would also act as producers, alongside Peter Kiernan and Gregory Jacobs, through Tatum and Carolin's production company Free Association. Tatum, Carolin, and Rodriguez previously collaborated as executive producers on War Dog: A Soldier's Best Friend (2017), an HBO documentary that explored the relationship between soldiers and their military working dogs. On March 2, 2020, Metro-Goldwyn-Mayer acquired North American distribution rights to the film.

In addition to co-directing the film, Tatum also stars in the lead role. On November 15, 2019, principal photography was announced set to start in the middle of 2020. It filmed in Valencia and Lancaster, California, amid the COVID-19 pandemic. In December 2020, Q'orianka Kilcher was added to the cast. Composer Thomas Newman composed the score for Dog.

Release

Theatrical
The film was originally scheduled to be released in the United States on February 12, 2021, by Metro-Goldwyn-Mayer, but was pushed back to July, due to the COVID-19 pandemic. The date was later revealed to be July 16. It was then pushed back again to February 18, 2022.

Marketing
According to iSpot, United Artists Releasing spent $16.3 million in television spots that generated 1.17 billion impressions. The film was particularly advertised on Fox News, CBS, TLC, NBC, and ABC across programs including the Winter Olympics, the NFL, re-runs of Friends, and Hannity. According to social media firm RelishMix, social digital awareness hit 81.9 million across Facebook, Twitter, YouTube, and Instagram before opening. Tatum's 45.6 million followers on social media were highlighted as a significant factor in the film's box office performance.

Home media
The film was released digitally on March 11, 2022, followed by a Blu-ray and DVD release on May 10, 2022, by Warner Bros. Home Entertainment. The film was released to Amazon Prime Video on September 16, 2022, 210 days after its theatrical release.

Reception

Box office 
Dog grossed $61.8million in the United States and Canada, and $23.2million in other territories, for a worldwide total of $85million.

In the United States and Canada, Dog was released alongside Uncharted and The Cursed, and was projected to gross $6–11 million from 3,677 theaters in its opening weekend, and $7.5–14 million over the four-day Presidents' Day holiday frame. The film earned $5 million on its first day, including $1.26 million from Valentine's Day (February 14) and Thursday night previews. Its opening surpassed projections, grossing $14.9 million in three days and $17.4 million for the four day weekend, finishing second at the box office behind Uncharted. Overall audiences during its opening were 54% female, 73% above the age of 25, 53% above 35, and 37% above 45. The film grossed $10.2 million in its second weekend, remaining in second place behind Uncharted. It later made $6.1 million in its third, $5.2 million in its fourth, $4 million in its fifth, $2.1 million in its sixth, $1.3 million in its seventh, and $514,606 in its eighth. The film dropped out of the box office top ten in its ninth weekend, finishing twelfth with $143,811.

Critical response 

  Audiences polled by CinemaScore gave the film an average grade of "A–" on an A+ to F scale, while those at PostTrak gave it an 82% positive score, with 66% saying they would definitely recommend it.

Music 
The score was composed by Thomas Newman. An official soundtrack was not released with the film. The film contains music licensed from artists such as Kurt Vile, A Tribe Called Quest, Anderson .Paak, My Morning Jacket, Alabama Shakes, John Prine and Kenny Rogers. Season Kent was credited as the music supervisor for the film and was solely responsible for selecting all the credited songs.

References

External links
 

2022 comedy films
2022 directorial debut films
2020s comedy road movies
2020s English-language films
American comedy road movies
FilmNation Entertainment films
Films about United States Army Rangers
Films about war dogs
Films postponed due to the COVID-19 pandemic
Films produced by Gregory Jacobs
Films scored by Thomas Newman
Films set in Arizona
Films set in Washington (state)
Films shot in Los Angeles
Metro-Goldwyn-Mayer films
Films about post-traumatic stress disorder
2020s American films